Alexandra Johnson may refer to:

 Alexandra Johnson (Highlander), a character in the film Highlander III: The Sorcerer
 Alex Johnson (climber) (born 1989), full name Alexandra Johnson, American rock climber
 Alexandra Uteev Johnson (1946–2002), United States Foreign Service Officer

See also
Alexzandra Johnson (born 1986), Canadian singer-songwriter
Alexander Johnson (disambiguation), multiple people